Iris Maity  is an Indian model and actress. She participated in the reality show Bigg Boss Bangla 1 in 2013.

Early life
After her graduation in science, she earned an MBA degree in marketing. She is a trained dancer, and can also sing and paint. Her father, Bhaskar Maity, is a football player, who represented India in the Asian Games, 1979. Her mother is a homemaker, and she also has a younger brother. Iris was crowned Get Gorgeous 2008. Get Gorgeous is Channel V India's launch pad for aspiring models across India. As winner of Channel V India's Get Gorgeous 5, Iris won  contract with Channel V India and ICE Model Management. She also won Miss India Tourism Metropolitan in 2007. She was adjudged with the "I AM Photogenic" title at the I AM She 2010, the first Miss India Universe pageant, which was held on 28 May 2010 in Mumbai. She is also trained in Martial Arts.

Career
Iris is a model, and has appeared in a few Hindi films. She is the winner of Channel V India's Get Gorgeous 5, an Indian reality show. She also participated in the first season of the most controversial non-fiction popular Bengali reality show Bigg Boss Bangla 1. She has appeared in print campaigns with Fair and Lovely, Nestle Munch, Satya Paul and a TVC for 7 UP. She worked with designers Manish Malhotra, Varun Behl and others. She had roles in mainstream Hindi movies such as Soch Lo as Riva and Tutiya Dil as Anuradha (Anu).

Filmography

Films

Television

Web

References

External links

Actresses in Hindi cinema
Bengali actresses
Female models from West Bengal
Indian film actresses
Living people
Bigg Boss Bangla contestants
Year of birth missing (living people)